Jakub Tancík (born 4 January 2000) is a Slovak footballer who plays for Spartak Myjava as a right-winger.

Club career

FC Nitra
Tancík made his Fortuna Liga debut for Nitra against Ružomberok on 21 July 2019. Ružomberok won the home fixture 1-0. Tancík was replaced after some 50 minutes by Lukáš Fabiš.

References

External links
 FC Nitra official club profile
 Futbalnet profile
 
 

2000 births
Living people
Sportspeople from Nitra
Slovak footballers
Association football midfielders
FC Nitra players
MFK Ružomberok players
Spartak Myjava players
2. Liga (Slovakia) players
3. Liga (Slovakia) players
Slovak Super Liga players